The 2010–11 UEFA Europa League was the second season of the UEFA Europa League, Europe's secondary club football tournament organised by UEFA, and the 40th edition overall including its predecessor, the UEFA Cup. It began on 1 July 2010, with the first qualifying round matches, and concluded on 18 May 2011, with the final at the Aviva Stadium in Dublin, Republic of Ireland, between Porto and first-time finalists Braga. This was the first all-Portuguese final of a European competition and only the third time that two Portuguese teams faced each other in Europe, following Braga's elimination of Benfica in the semi-finals. Porto defeated Braga 1–0, with a goal from the competition's top goalscorer Radamel Falcao, and won their second title in the competition, after victory in the 2002–03 UEFA Cup. Atletico Madrid were the defending champions but were eliminated in group stage.

Association team allocation 
A total of 194 teams from 53 UEFA associations participated in the 2010–11 UEFA Europa League. Associations were allocated places according to their 2009 UEFA country coefficient, which took into account their performance in European competitions from 2004–05 to 2008–09.

Below is the qualification scheme for the 2010–11 UEFA Europa League:
Associations 1–6 each have three teams qualify
Associations 7–9 each have four teams qualify
Associations 10–51 each have three teams qualify, except Liechtenstein, which have one team qualify (as Liechtenstein only have a domestic cup and no domestic league)
Associations 52–53 each have two teams qualify (an increase from only one team in the previous season)
The top three associations of the 2009–10 UEFA Fair Play ranking each gain an additional berth
Moreover, 33 teams eliminated from the 2010–11 UEFA Champions League are transferred to the Europa League.

Association ranking 

Notes
(FP): Additional fair play berth (Sweden, Denmark, Finland)
(UCL): Additional teams transferred from the UEFA Champions League

Distribution 
The winners of the 2009–10 UEFA Europa League, Atlético Madrid, were guaranteed a place in the group stage as the title holder, since they did not qualify for the 2010–11 UEFA Champions League. However, they also qualified for the Europa League third qualifying round through domestic performance, as they were the runners-up of the 2009–10 Copa del Rey to Champions League-qualified Sevilla. As a result, this place in the third qualifying round was vacated, which in turn led to the following changes to the default allocation system in order to compensate for this vacant spot:
The domestic cup winners of association 28 (Finland) have been promoted from the second qualifying round to the third qualifying round.
The domestic cup winners of associations 52 and 53 (Malta and San Marino) have been promoted from the first qualifying to the second qualifying round.

Redistribution rules 
A Europa League place is vacated when a team qualifies for both the Champions League and the Europa League, or qualifies for the Europa League by more than one method. When a place is vacated, it is redistributed within the national association by the following rules:
 When the domestic cup winners (considered as the "highest-placed" qualifiers within the national association) also qualify for the Champions League, their Europa League place is vacated, and the remaining Europa League qualifiers are moved up one place, with the final place (with the earliest starting round) taken by the domestic cup runners-up, provided they do not already qualify for the Champions League or the Europa League. Otherwise, this place is taken by the highest-placed league finishers that have not yet qualified for the Europa League.
 When the domestic cup winners also qualify for the Europa League through league position, their place through the league position is vacated, and the Europa League qualifiers that finish lower in the league are moved up one place, with the final place taken by the highest-placed league finishers that have not yet qualified for the Europa League.
 A place vacated by the League Cup winners is taken by the highest-placed league finishers that have not yet qualified for the Europa League.
 A Fair Play place is taken by the highest-ranked team in the domestic Fair Play table that has not yet qualified for the Champions League or the Europa League.

Teams 
The labels in the parentheses show how each team qualified for the place of its starting round:
 TH: Title holders
 CW: Cup winners
 CR: Cup runners-up
 LC: League Cup winners
 Nth: League position
 P-W: End-of-season European competition play-offs winners
 FP: Fair play
 UCL: Relegated from the Champions League
 GS: Third-placed teams from the group stage
 PO: Losers from the play-off round
 Q3: Losers from the third qualifying round

Notes
England (ENG): Portsmouth, the runners-up of the 2009–10 FA Cup to Champions League-qualified Chelsea, did not obtain a UEFA licence, meaning they could not qualify for Europe. Portsmouth had appealed to UEFA, the Premier League and the English FA, but the latter two would not allow late applications for the licence. As a result, the seventh-placed team of the 2009–10 Premier League, Liverpool, claimed the Europa League spot in the third qualifying round.
Republic of Ireland (IRL): Since the third- and fourth-placed teams of the 2009 League of Ireland, Cork City and Derry City, were dissolved and expelled from the league respectively after the season was completed, the fifth-placed team, Dundalk, claimed the Europa League spot in the first qualifying round.
Lithuania (LTU): Vėtra, the runners-up of the 2009 A Lyga and also the runners-up of the 2009–10 Lithuanian Football Cup to Champions League-qualified Ekranas, were denied the UEFA license for the 2010–11 season and therefore could not represent Lithuania in the UEFA Europa League. As a result, all Europa League spots were awarded to teams based on their league positions. Therefore, the fourth-placed team, Šiauliai, were moved from the first qualifying round to the second qualifying round, while the fifth-placed team, Tauras Tauragė, claimed the Europa League spot in the first qualifying round.
Spain (ESP): Mallorca, the fifth-placed team of the 2009–10 La Liga, were not admitted to the UEFA Europa League due to being immersed in a creditor contest (not by reason of having debt) a situation that does not meet the necessary admission criteria for participating in the UEFA competitions. As a result, the seventh-placed team, Villarreal, claimed the Europa League spot in the play-off round. On 30 July, UEFA's Appeals Body dismissed Mallorca's appeal against the infraction.

Round and draw dates 
All draws held at UEFA headquarters in Nyon, Switzerland unless stated otherwise.

Matches in the qualifying, play-off, and knockout rounds may also be played on Tuesdays or Wednesdays instead of the regular Thursdays due to scheduling conflicts.

Seeding 
The draws for the qualifying rounds, the play-off round and the group stage are all seeded based on the 2010 UEFA club coefficients. The coefficients are calculated on the basis of a combination of 20% of the value of the respective national association's coefficient for the period from 2005–06 to 2009–10 inclusive and the clubs' individual performances in the UEFA club competitions during the same period. Clubs are ordered by their coefficients and then divided into pots as required.

In the draws for the qualifying rounds and the play-off round, the teams are divided evenly into one seeded and one unseeded pot, based on their club coefficients. A seeded team is drawn against an unseeded team, with the order of legs in each tie also being decided randomly. Due to the limited time between matches, the draws for the second and third qualifying rounds take place before the results of the previous round are known. The seeding in each draw is carried out under the assumption that all of the highest-ranked clubs of the previous round are victorious. If a lower-ranked club is victorious, it simply takes the place of its defeated opponent in the next round. Prior to these draws, UEFA may form "groups" in accordance with the principles set by the Club Competitions Committee, but they are purely for convenience of the draw and do not resemble any real groupings in the sense of the competition, while ensuring that teams from the same association not drawn against each other.

In the draw for the group stage, the 48 teams are split into four pots of twelve teams, based on their club coefficients, with the title holder (if participating) automatically placed into Pot 1. Each group contains one team from each pot, but teams from the same association cannot be drawn into the same group.

In the draw for the first knockout stage, the twelve group winners and the four better third-placed teams from the Champions League group stage (based on their match record in the group stage) are seeded, and the twelve group runners-up and the other four third-placed teams from the Champions League group stage are unseeded. A seeded team is drawn against an unseeded team, with the seeded team hosting the second leg. Teams from the same group or the same association cannot be drawn against each other.

In the draws for the round of 16 onwards, there are no seedings, and teams from the same group or the same association may be drawn with each other.

Qualifying rounds 

In the qualifying and play-off rounds, teams play against each other over two legs on a home-and-away basis.

The draw for the first two qualifying rounds was made on 21 June 2010, while the draw for the third qualifying round was made on 16 July 2010.

First qualifying round 
The first legs were played on 1 July, and the second legs were played on 8 July 2010.

|}
Note 1: Order of legs reversed after original draw.

Second qualifying round 
The first legs were played on 15 July, and the second legs were played on 22 and 23 July 2010.

|}

Notes
Note 2: Order of legs reversed after original draw.
Note 3: Original match abandoned in the 80th minute due to adverse weather conditions, with MYPA leading 1–0. The match was replayed on 23 July 2010 at 18:30 CEST from the beginning.
Note 4: UEFA awarded Győri ETO a 3–0 win due to Atyrau fielding a suspended player in the first leg. The original match had ended in a 2–0 win for Győri ETO.
Note 5: UEFA awarded Budućnost Podgorica a 3–0 win due to Baku fielding a suspended player in the first leg. The original match had ended in a 2–1 win for Baku.

Third qualifying round 
The first legs were played on 27 and 29 July, and the second legs were played on 3 and 5 August 2010.

|}

Notes
Note 6: Order of legs reversed after original draw.

Play-off round 

The draw for the play-off round was held on 6 August 2010. The first legs were played on 17 and 19 August, and the second legs were played on 24 and 26 August 2010.

|}

Note 7: Order of legs reversed after original draw.

Group stage 

The 48 clubs were drawn into twelve groups of four on 27 August 2010 in Monaco. In each group, teams play against each other home-and-away in a round-robin format. The matchdays are 16 September, 30 September, 21 October, 4 November, 1–2 December, and 15–16 December 2010. The group winners and runners-up advance to the round of 32, where they are joined by the eight third-placed teams from the group stage of the 2010–11 UEFA Champions League.

If two or more teams are equal on points on completion of the group matches, the following criteria are applied to determine the rankings (in descending order):
 higher number of points obtained in the group matches played among the teams in question;
 superior goal difference from the group matches played among the teams in question;
 higher number of goals scored away from home in the group matches played among the teams in question;
 superior goal difference from all group matches played;
 higher number of goals scored;
 higher number of coefficient points accumulated by the club in question, as well as its association, over the previous five seasons.

Following a trial at last year's UEFA Europa League, UEFA have announced that in both this year's and the 2011–12 competition, two extra officials would be used – with one on each goal line.

Group A

Group B

Group C

Group D

Group E

Group F

Group G

Group H

Group I

Group J

Group K

Group L

Knockout phase 

In the knockout phase, teams play against each other over two legs on a home-and-away basis, except for the one-match final.

The draw for the round of 32 and round of 16 was held on 17 December 2010. The draws for the quarter-finals, semi-finals and final (to determine the "home" team) were held on 18 March 2011.

Bracket

Round of 32 
The first legs were played on 15 and 17 February, and the second legs were played on 22, 23 and 24 February 2011.

|}

Round of 16 
The first legs were played on 10 March, and the second legs were played on 17 March 2011.

|}

Note 8: Order of legs reversed after original draw due to proximity between the cities of Porto and Braga.

Quarter-finals 
The first legs were played on 7 April, and the second legs were played on 14 April 2011.

|}

Note 9: Order of legs reversed after original draw due to proximity between the cities of Porto and Braga.

Semi-finals 
The first legs were played on 28 April, and the second legs were played on 5 May 2011.

|}

Note 10: Order of legs reversed after original draw due to proximity between the cities of Porto and Braga.

Final 

The final was played on 18 May 2011 at Aviva Stadium in Dublin, Republic of Ireland. Due to UEFA rules against corporate sponsorship outside the federation, for the final the stadium was referred to as the "Dublin Arena".

Top goalscorers 
The top scorers from the 2010–11 UEFA Europa League (excluding qualifying rounds and play-off round) are as follows:

Source: Top scorers (accessed 5 May 2011)

See also 
 2010–11 UEFA Champions League
 2011 UEFA Super Cup

References

External links 

2010–11 UEFA Europa League, UEFA.com

 
2
2010-11